The Maraura or  Marrawarra people are an Aboriginal group whose traditional lands are located in Far West New South Wales and South Australia, Australia.

Language
The Maraura spoke the southernmost dialect of Paakantyi. A wordlist of the language was taken down by John Bulmer.

Country
Inland they extended west to the anabranch of the Darling River as far as Popilta Lake, and upstream to Avoca.

Society
The Maraura is known to have been divided into at least 5 hordes
 Condelkoo
 Boolkarlie
 Moattilkoo
 Bullalre
 Toopparlie

A Nanya group is also recorded. A. A. Radcliffe-Brown mentions also a Yakumku sub-tribe of the Maraura, dwelling around Lake Victoria.

The social organization was dual, centered on the relations between two moieties, the Kilpara and the Makwara/Makgara.

Culture
In relating their tribal mythology to Tindale, -the tale in question was an account of how the hero Wa:ku sought to marry two sisters-  his informants, he recorded, would draw pictures on the ground, illustrating the narrative. A. P. Elkin cites this as an example corroborating a theory he advanced according to which rock art engravings functioned as mnemonics, with a propaedeutic function in helping to pass on to initiands the legendary lore of the elders.

Tindale recorded their legends, particularly regarding the crow and eagle, in a work published in 1939.

History
According to hearsay recorded by George Taplin, between the years 1831 and 1836 the Maraura migrated down the Darling River to their modern lands. According to an early report (1842) the South Australian Kaurna referred to this area as Mettelittela Yerta ("the stolen land" or "the land of thieves"). They ambushed and killed stockmen, which resulted in many if not most of the tribe are said to have been killed, during 1839–1846, by European explorers and aggressive overlanders—e.g. at the Rufus River massacre (where the South Australian Police were also involved).

Lockhart indicated that in 1857 the Maraura frequented Lake Victoria in summer and the back plains in winter after rains had filled small waterholes.

Though elopement, which was severely frowned on and subject to sanctions by tribal law, is not known to have been the motive, sometime around 1863 two members of the Nanya branch of the Maraura left their horde near settlement of Wentworth near the Murray River and fled into bushland. They and their descendants, by then grown to some 28 people, were found in the 1890s, some three decades later. Shortly afterwards, within 3 years, they were rounded up and forced to become "civilized". The outline of the story, the locale and the dates, coincide with an oral history taken from the informant Pinkie Mack, in which however, the couple were members of the Yaraldi people.

Notable people
 Nanya (1835-1895) was one of the last Aboriginal people of New South Wales to persist in living according to the traditional tribal ways. He led his family into exile - it was later thought by ethnographic inquirers that he had intermarried with a woman of his own Makwarra moiety, a crime in native law punishable by death. The area he settled in was the harsh "Scotia blocks", a waterless tract of mallee land between the Great Darling Anabranch and the South Australian border. There they managed to subsist for 3 decades. His group, comprising 12 men, 8 women and 10 children, were persuaded to come back in by aboriginal trackers in 1893 who led them back to Popiltah station. They lived on in Pooncarie, preferring that to a civilized settlement. Many of his offspring died from diseases contracted from white settlers. His son Billy, who had received an education in Adelaide, is recorded to have died in custody.

Alternative names
 Mareawura, Mare-aura, Maroura, Marowra, Marowera
 Marraa" Warree", Marrawarra
 Waimbio (wimbaia = wimbadja (man)).
 Wimbaja, Wiimbaio
 Beriko (language name)
 Ilaila (i:la = no).

Some words
 kambia (father) The term used by males)
 ŋamaga. (ngamara) (mother) (The term used by males)
 kanau. (wedge-tailed eagle|eaglehawk) (also a totem)
 namba. (silver fish) (also a totem)
 pudali. (a star) (also a totem)
 pil'ta. (opossum) (also a totem)
 pärndu. Murray cod (also a totem)
 thandoa (whiteman)

Notes

Citations

Sources

Aboriginal peoples of New South Wales
Aboriginal peoples of South Australia